The International Association for the Cognitive Science of Religion (IACSR), founded in 2006, is a scholarly association dedicated to the promotion of the Cognitive Science of Religion. The IACSR is an interdisciplinary association, including scholars from a wide variety of disciplines in the human, social, natural and health sciences that are interested in the academic, scientific study of religious phenomena. The IACSR seeks to advance the naturalistic study of religion. It is strictly scientific and does not encourage or welcome those who are interested in dialogue between science and religion, attempt to find religion in science and science in religion, or attempt to validate religious or spiritual doctrines through cognitive science.

The IACSR supports the Electronic Archive for Religion & Cognition at the Centre for Religion & Cognition, Groningen, the Journal of Cognition & Culture (Brill Publishers), and two book series, Scientific Studies of Religion: Inquiry and Explanation (Bloomsbury Academic), which was formerly the series Cognitive Science of Religion (AltaMira Press), and Religion, Cognition and Culture (Equinox Press).

History
The IACSR was founded in 2006, and the inaugural meeting took place in Aarhus University, in Denmark.

First General Assembly: January 7, 2006, Aarhus University, Denmark.

Second General Assembly: May 30, 2008, Aarhus University, Denmark.

Third General Assembly: August 16, 2010, University of Toronto, Canada.

Fourth General Assembly: June 25, 2012, Aarhus University, Denmark.

Fifth General Assembly: June 20, 2014, LEVYNA, Masaryk University, Brno, Czech Republic.

Sixth General Assembly: August 22, 2016, University of British Columbia, Vancouver, Canada.

Seventh General Assembly: August 12-16, 2018, Boston, MA, USA. 

Other IACSR meetings:

July 29, 2009, at the Free University of Amsterdam, in conjunction with the annual meeting of the Cognitive Science Society.

Executive committee
Past President:
Joseph Bulbulia, Maclaurin Goodfellow Chair, University of Auckland

President:
Ann Taves, Professor, Department of Religious Studies, University of California, Santa Barbara

President Elect:
Dimitris Xygalatas, Assistant Professor, University of Connecticut

Secretary General:
John H. Shaver, Lecturer, University of Otago

Treasurer:
Justin Lane, Postdoctoral Fellow, Boston University

See also
Cognitive science of religion
Cognitive science
Cognitive anthropology
Religious studies

Notes

External links
Official home page of the IACSR

Organizations established in 2006
International educational organizations
Cognitive science organizations
Religion academics
Psychology of religion
Anthropology of religion
Evolutionary psychology
Cognitive psychology
Religious studies
Cognitive science of religion